Demetrious Maxie (born October 18, 1973) is a former Canadian Football League defensive end. He has been the defensive line coach for the Edmonton Elks since 2017.

While playing with the Baltimore Stallions he won the only Grey Cup by a non-Canadian team, and followed with two wins with the Toronto Argonauts.

References

1973 births
Living people
African-American players of Canadian football
American players of Canadian football
Baltimore Stallions players
Calgary Stampeders players
Canadian football defensive linemen
Edmonton Elks coaches
Montreal Alouettes players
Players of American football from Louisiana
Saskatchewan Roughriders players
Toronto Argonauts players
UTEP Miners football players
21st-century African-American sportspeople
20th-century African-American sportspeople